Gorzyce  is a village in Tarnobrzeg County, Subcarpathian Voivodeship, in south-eastern Poland. It is the seat of the gmina (administrative district) called Gmina Gorzyce.

Gorzyce has a population of 10,005, making it one of the largest village in Poland. There are 15,642 people living in Gmina Gorzyce, and 10,005 people living in the village of Gorzyce, that makes 72,81 % of Gmina Gorzyce population.

A river flowing next to the village is called Łęg.

References

Villages in Tarnobrzeg County